Virginia Wolf were a British rock band from Manchester, England. Their two albums were Virginia Wolf (1986) and Push (1987). The band existed from 1977 until 1988 and featured Nick Bold on lead guitar, Chris Ousey on vocals, Jason Bonham (son of John Bonham) on drums, Jo Burt on bass and David John Hinson on keyboards. They released five singles "It's In Your Eyes" "Waiting For Your Love" " One Night" and "Don't Break Away" all released on Atlantic Records and "Let It Out" on Warner Sister Publishing.

The band were formed in Worsley, England, near Manchester. Their first 'self titled' album was produced by Roger Taylor from Queen in 1986. To promote the album the band toured the U.S. with The Firm featuring Jimmy Page – Led Zeppelin and Paul Rodgers – Free, Bad Company,  and later – Queen. 1987 saw the band (Bold; Ousey; Bonham; Burt & Hinson) fly back to the US to record their 2nd album "Push", which was recorded at Fantasy Studios in Berkeley, California and was produced by Kevin Elson (Journey) and assisted by Wally Buck. After returning to the UK, the band played three farewell shows in each of their respective cities, after which they disbanded. Both Chris Ousey and David John Hinson would later go on to form Heartland. Jo Burt played with many well established artists. Jason Bonham went on to join Jimmy Page and Nick Bold went on to establish a successful solo career.

Personnel

Principal members
Nick Bold – guitar
Chris Ousey – vocals
Jo Burt – Bass
Jason Bonham – drums
David John Hinson – keyboards, vocals

Early members
Dave Irving – drums
Paul Johnson – drums
Steve Brown – vocals
Clive Corner – bass
Jeff Waters – bass
Pete (Earl Wakey) Wakefield – vocals
Martin Gillbanks (Gilbanks) – drums
Haydn Jones – guitar

Discography

Studio albums
 Virginia Wolf (1986)
 Push (1987)

Studio Singles
 "It's In Your Eyes" (1986)
 "Waiting For You" (1986)
 "One Night" (1987)
 "Don't Break Away" (1987)
 "Let It Out" (?)

References

External links
https://www.discogs.com/artist/1735383-Virginia-Wolf
https://www.allmusic.com/artist/virginia-wolf-mn0000216968/biography
https://www.realgonerocks.com/2010/03/virginia-wolf-virginia-wolf/

English rock music groups
Musical groups established in 1977
Musical groups disestablished in 1988
People from Worsley